Frank Ripploh (September 2, 1949 – June 24, 2002) was a German actor, film director, and author.  He is best remembered for his semi-autobiographical 1980 film Taxi zum Klo.  The film, produced on a shoestring budget of 100,000 DM,  explored the day-to-day life of a Berlin schoolteacher who also led a very active gay sex life.  Extremely explicit for its day, and for some time afterward (to the point where the film was not passed uncut by the British Board of Film Classification until 2011), Taxi zum Klo was considered groundbreaking for the subject matter it portrayed, and achieved something of a cult status among gay audiences of the time. In 1987, Ripploh directed a sequel entitled Taxi nach Kairo, but the film was not considered as successful as its predecessor, and it was not released outside Germany.

Ripploh also participated in the creation of a small number of other art house films during the 1980s, and had a role in the 1982 movie Querelle directed by Rainer Werner Fassbinder. Ripploh died of cancer in 2002.

Filmography

References

External links

1949 births
2002 deaths
People from Rheine
Film people from North Rhine-Westphalia
LGBT film directors
German LGBT screenwriters
German gay actors
German gay writers
German male screenwriters
Gay screenwriters
Actors from North Rhine-Westphalia
20th-century German screenwriters
20th-century LGBT people
Deaths from cancer in Germany